The 2014–15 La Salle Explorers women's basketball team will represent La Salle University during the 2014–15 college basketball season. Jeff Williams resumes the responsibility as head coach for a fifth consecutive season. The Explorers were members of the Atlantic 10 Conference and play their home games at the Tom Gola Arena. They finished the season 15–16, 5–11 in A-10 play to finish in a four way tie for tenth place. They advanced to the second round of the A-10 women's tournament where they lost to Rhode Island.

2014–15 media

La Salle Explorers Sports Network
Select Explorers games will be broadcast online by the La Salle Portal. The A-10 Digital Network will carry all non-televised Explorers home games and most conference road games.

2014–15 Roster

Schedule

|-
!colspan=9 style="background:#FFC700; color:#00386B;"| Regular Season

|-
!colspan=9 style="background:#00386B; color:#FFC700;"| Atlantic 10 Tournament

Rankings
2014–15 NCAA Division I women's basketball rankings

See also
 2014–15 La Salle Explorers men's basketball team
 La Salle Explorers women's basketball

References

La Salle
La Salle Explorers women's basketball seasons